Erlenbach is a small river of Bavaria, Germany. It is a left tributary of the Laufach in the village Laufach.

See also
List of rivers of Bavaria

Rivers of Bavaria
Rivers of the Spessart
Rivers of Germany